Crime in South Australia is prevented by the South Australia Police (SAPOL), various state and federal courts in the criminal justice system and the state Department for Correctional Services, which administers the prisons and remand centre.

Crime statistics for all categories of offence in the state are provided on the SAPOL website, in the form of rolling 12-month totals. Crime statistics from the 2017–18 national ABS Crime Victimisation Survey show that between the years 2008–09 and 2017–18, the rate of victimisation in South Australia declined for assault and most household crime types.

In 2013 Adelaide was ranked as the safest capital city in the country.

Crime statistics

In 2013, Adelaide was ranked the safest in the country with the lowest rate of crime per population. , crime rates across the state had continued to decrease.

Notable crimes

 Beaumont children disappearance on Australia Day in 1966 - still unsolved.
 NCA bombing on Waymouth Street in 1994 - A SA Police member and a lawyer were killed.
Truro murders - Murders committed by a young man just outside the town of Truro
 Barossa valley shooting - Police went to arrest a Barossa valley criminal Tony Grosser on various charges, but were shot at. One of the officers, Derrick McManus was shot multiple (14) times but defied medical knowledge and survived.
 Snowtown murders (1992-1999) - serial killings which occurred mainly in two outer-suburban suburbs of Adelaide, Salisbury and Elizabeth
 The Family Murders (1970s-mid-1980s). Believed to involve a series of sexual assaults and murders done by a group of perpetrators, though only Bevan Spencer von Einem was charged, and he was found guilty of only one of the murders
 Murder of Derrance Stevenson (1979) - well known lawyer Stevenson, an associate of Bevan Spencer von Einem, was murdered and his body stuffed into a freezer in his distinctive Parkside home
 Rundle Street Siege (1976)
 Shooting of Dr Margaret Tobin, 2002 - Dr Tobin was shot by her criminal colleague, Dr Eric Jean Gacy in Hindmarsh Square. She was transferred to the nearby RAH but could not make it.
 Rodney Clavell was an ex jail cop and criminal. He had committed more than a dozen offences including gun and traffic offences. He also held up a shop in the Adelaide CBD, shutting down a whole section of the CBD while talking to police negotiators.
Murders of Karlie Pearce-Stevenson and Khandalyce Pearce: In the 2010s, the body of a little girl was found stuffed in a suitcase, next to a major highway. It took police months to identify the body and when they did, the girl was named Khandalyce. Her mother was also murdered but her body was found interstate.
Jason Downie murdered three locals in Kapunda, in 2010. As he is not Australian citizen, he will be deported after his sentence.
A ship carrying 400 kilograms of cocaine was intercepted in March 2022. It was the biggest seizure in South Australian history. 
The Somerton Man was found on the beach in the 1940s. His identity was not known and neither was the cause of death. In 2022, the authorities were able to discover his identity.

Judicial system

In addition to the various federal courts, justice is administered by the Supreme Court of South Australia, the District Court, the Magistrates Court and the South Australian Civil and Administrative Tribunal.

Prisons

The Department for Correctional Services (DCS) runs the prison service, in South Australia, except for the Adelaide Remand Centre, which is privately managed by Serco, and Mount Gambier Prison, which is run by G4S.

Prisons
Adelaide Pre-Release Centre
Adelaide Remand Centre -  maximum-security prison facility for prisoners on remand
Adelaide Women's Prison - both sentenced prisoners and those on remand; high, medium and low security female prisoners 
Cadell Training Centre - minimum security prison
Mobilong Prison -  low and medium security prison for men at Murray Bridge
 Mount Gambier Prison - the only privately run prison in SA
Port Augusta Prison - high, medium and low security prisoners including protectees and special needs prisoners; includes some women
Port Lincoln Prison -  low security prisoners are involved in running an agricultural business
 Yatala Labour Prison - high-security men's prison.

See also

 Punishment in Australia
 SAPOL (South Australia Police)

References

Further reading

External links
Department of Correctional Services (DCS)
South Australia Police (SAPOL)

 
 
Murder in South Australia